Marvin M. "Mark" Smith is an American businessman and politician who is a member of the South Carolina House of Representatives from the 99th district. He has served since 2020.

Early life and education 
Smith is a native of Bamberg, South Carolina. He earned an associate degree from Fayetteville Technical Community College.

Career 
A businessman, he is the owner and president of McAlister-Smith Funeral Homes, the Avinger Funeral Home, and the Palmetto Cremation Society. He has also served as a member of the South Carolina Advisory Council on Aging. In 2017, Smith was a Republican candidate for the 99th district South Carolina House of Representatives, losing to Nancy Mace. In October 2019, Smith again announced his candidacy for the 99th district after Mace opted to run for the United States House of Representatives. Smith defeated David Herndon in the Republican primary and Democratic nominee Jen Gibson in the November general election.

Personal life 
Smith and his wife, Elayne (née Forastiere), have three children.

References 

Living people
Republican Party members of the South Carolina House of Representatives
Year of birth missing (living people)
People from Bamberg, South Carolina
Businesspeople from South Carolina
21st-century American politicians